The 1956 NCAA Men's Golf Championship was the 18th annual tournament to determine the national champions of NCAA men's collegiate golf.

The tournament was held at the Ohio State University Golf Club in Columbus, Ohio.

Houston won the team title and Rick Jones from Ohio State won the individual title over Houston's Rex Baxter Jr.

Team competition

Leaderboard

References

NCAA Men's Golf Championship
Golf in Ohio
NCAA Golf Championship
NCAA Golf Championship
NCAA Golf Championship
NCAA Golf Championship